Oluwanisola "Sola" Abolaji (born March 27, 1985) is a former American soccer player.

Career

College and Amateur
Abolaji attended Eaglecrest High School in Aurora, Colorado and played college soccer at Barton County Community College in Kansas, where he was named to the NJCAA Region VI All-Region second team in 2003. He transferred to Northern Oklahoma College in 2004, where he was named the team's defensive MVP and helped lead the Mavericks to the NJCAA Region II championship. He then transferred again, to the University at Buffalo, where he spent his junior and senior years. He played 18 games for the Bulls his senior year, scoring two goals and one assist, the helper coming on the game-winning goal in the Bulls' upset win over 19th-ranked Northern Illinois.

While in college, Abolaji also played for Colorado Rapids U23's in the USL Premier Development League.

Professional
Abolaji was the first overall selection in the 2007 USL-1 Draft by the Carolina RailHawks, making him the first athlete from the University of Buffalo to be drafted first overall in any professional sports draft. Having played just 10 games for the RailHawks, Abolaji was traded to the Vancouver Whitecaps in exchange for Joel John Bailey on July 29, 2007, but later left the team after a coaching change.

After a few years playing in the lower tiers of the American soccer pyramid, he transitioned to Scandinavia where he played with several teams. In 2015, he returned to the United States and was a long-term trialist with the Chicago Fire and the Sacramento Republic, featuring in games against the San Jose Earthquakes. He joined the Ventura County Fusion, where he featured prominently in their 2nd Round U.S. Open Cup win over the L.A. Galaxy. In January 2016 he returned to Scandinavia.

Personal
His parents are of Nigerian origin. His name "Oluwanisola" means "God creates Wealth" in Yoruba.

References

1985 births
Living people
American sportspeople of Nigerian descent
American men's soccer players
American expatriate sportspeople in Canada
Soccer players from Colorado
North Carolina FC players
Vancouver Whitecaps (1986–2010) players
Colorado Rapids U-23 players
Thunder Bay Chill players
Expatriate soccer players in Canada
Association football defenders
Association football midfielders
People from Carbondale, Illinois
Soccer players from Illinois
Buffalo Bulls men's soccer players
USL First Division players
USL League Two players
Barton Community College alumni
Junior college men's soccer players in the United States